"Street Talkin'" was the first and only single released from Slick Rick's final album, The Art of Storytelling. It was released in 1999 and was produced by Jazze Pha. It also featured a verse from Big Boi of Outkast and a music video was released along with the single in 1999. The song peaked at #65 on the Hot R&B/Hip-Hop songs chart and #22 on the Hot Rap Tracks.

Uses
In March 2021, the song was featured in Last Chance U: Basketball, in the first season first episode "The Window".

1999 singles
1999 songs
Slick Rick songs
Big Boi songs
Songs written by Big Boi
Songs written by Slick Rick